SKF is a bearing and seal manufacturing company founded in Gothenburg, Sweden.

SKF may also refer to:

 Lackland Air Force Base (IATA and FAA LID codes), a US Air Force base in Texas
 Kelly Field Annex (IATA and FAA LID codes), a US Air Force facility in Texas
 ŠKF Sereď, a Slovak football team
 Salman Khan Films, India
 Smith, Kline & French, pharmaceutical company

See also